Sotiris Katoufas (alternate spelling Sotirios) (born July 10, 1979) is a Greek professional basketball player for AOF Porfyras of the Greek C Basket League. He is a 2.06 m (6 ft 9 in) tall power forward–center.

Professional career
After playing basketball with the junior youth teams of Olympiacos, from 1995 to 1997, Katoufas began his pro career with Papagou, during the 1997–98 season. He played in the Greek 2nd Division with Faros Keratsiniou. In 2017, he joined the Greek 3rd Division club Ionikos Nikaias.

References

External links
FIBA Game Center Profile
FIBA Europe Profile
Eurobasket.com Profile
Greek Basket League Profile 
Draftexpress.com Profile

1979 births
Living people
Centers (basketball)
Faros Keratsiniou B.C. players
Greek men's basketball players
Ikaros B.C. players
Ionikos N.F. B.C. players
Ionikos Nikaias B.C. players
Kolossos Rodou B.C. players
Panelefsiniakos B.C. players
Papagou B.C. players
Power forwards (basketball)
OFI Crete B.C. players
Basketball players from Athens